Nationality words link to articles with information on the nation's poetry or literature (for instance, Irish or France).

Events

Colonial America
 John Dickinson, "A Song for Freedom (Liberty Song)"
 Elizabeth Graeme Ferguson, "The Dream of the Patriotic Philosophical Farmer", political verse advocating an American embargo on British goods, Colonial America
 Milcah Martha Moore, "The Female Patriots. Address'd to the Daughters of Liberty in America, 1768", Colonial America
 Phillis Wheatley writes "To the King's Most Excellent Majesty," in which she praises George III for repealing the Stamp Act. Wheatley would later become a strong supporter of the American Revolution.
 "The Liberty Song" appears on July 16 in the Boston Gazette, called "probably the first American patriotic song"

United Kingdom
 Isaac Hawkins Browne, the elder, Poems Upon Various Subjects, Latin and English, edited by Isaac Hawkins Browne, the younger
 Thomas Gray, Poems by Mr Gray, including "The Fatal Sisters", "The Descent of Odin", "The Triumphs of Owen" but not "A Long Story"
 Richard Jago, Labour and Genius; or, The Mill-Stream, and the Cascade
 Lady Mary Montagu, Poetical Works
 Henry James Pye, Elegies on Different Occasions, published anonymously
 Alexander Ross, The Fortunate Sheperdess
 Christopher Smart, The Parables of Our Lord and Saviour Jesus Christ
 William Wilkie, Fables

Others
 Ephraim Luzzato, Ele Bene Hane'urim ("These Are the Sons of One's Youth"), Hebrew poetry published in London in an edition of 100 copies; more than 50 poems, mostly sonnets in quantitative-syllabic meters; many subsequent editions and influential among Hebrew poets of the Haskalah ("Enlightenment") movement in the 19th century.

Births
Death years link to the corresponding "[year] in poetry" article:
 October 11 – William Shepherd, English dissenting minister, politician, poet and writer (died 1847)
 November 18 – Zacharias Werner, German religious poet (died 1823)
 Wang Zhenyi, Chinese Qing dynasty female poet and astronomer (died 1797)

Deaths
Birth years link to the corresponding "[year] in poetry" article:
 March 28 – Thomas Mozeen, English actor and songwriter (born 1720?)
 August 17 (N. S.) – Vasily Kirillovich Trediakovsky, Russian poet (born 1703)
 December 20 – Carlo Innocenzio Maria Frugoni, Italian poet (born 1692)

See also

 List of years in poetry
 List of years in literature
 18th century in poetry
 18th century in literature
 French literature of the 18th century
 Sturm und Drang (the conventional translation is "Storm and Stress"; a more literal translation, however, might be "storm and urge", "storm and longing", "storm and drive" or "storm and impulse"), a movement in German literature (including poetry) and music from the late 1760s through the early 1780s
 List of years in poetry
 Poetry

Notes

18th-century poetry
Poetry